Buckhøj is a Danish surname. Notable people with the surname include:

 Henny Lindorff Buckhøj (1902–1979), Danish film actress
 Jørgen Buckhøj (1935–1994), Danish actor
 Per Buckhøj (1902–1964), Danish film actor

Danish-language surnames